Federico Mezio (Latin: Federicus Metius) (died 1612) was a Roman Catholic prelate who served as Bishop of Termoli (1602–1612).

Biography
On 14 Jan 1602, Federico Mezio was appointed during the papacy of Pope Clement VIII as Bishop of Termoli.
He served as Bishop of Termoli until his death in 1612.

References

External links and additional sources
 (Chronology of Bishops) 
 (Chronology of Bishops) 

17th-century Italian Roman Catholic bishops
Bishops appointed by Pope Clement VIII
1612 deaths